The 1983 Ottawa Rough Riders finished the season in 2nd place in the East Division with an 8–8 record. This season marked the last time an Ottawa football team hosted a playoff game until 2015 when the second-year Ottawa Redblacks hosted the East Final, where the Rough Riders lost the East-Semi Final game to Hamilton by a score of 33–31.

Offseason

CFL Draft

Preseason

Regular season

Standings

Schedule

Postseason

Awards and honours

CFL Awards
CFL's Most Outstanding Defensive Player Award – Greg Marshall (DE)
CFL's Most Outstanding Offensive Lineman Award – Rudy Phillips (OG)

CFL All-Stars

RB – Alvin "Skip" Walker
OG – Rudy Phillips
OT – Kevin Powell
DT – Gary Dulin
DE – Greg Marshall

References

Ottawa Rough Riders seasons
1983 Canadian Football League season by team